Beloved Liar is a 1950 West German romantic comedy film directed by Hans Schweikart and starring Elfie Mayerhofer, Hans Söhnker and Gustav Knuth.

It was made at the Bavaria Studios in Munich and on location at Lake Starnberg. The film's sets were designed by Robert Herlth.

Cast
 Elfie Mayerhofer as Jeanette
 Hans Söhnker as Rudolf Siebert
 Gustav Knuth as Braubach
 Erich Ponto as Plage
 Werner Fuetterer as Dr. Gößler
 Hans Leibelt as Direktor Berger
 Charlott Daudert as Modell
 Margarete Haagen as Frau Weber
 Thea Aichbichler as Frau Wanninger
 Marietheres Angerpointner as Anita
 Charlotta Vetrone as Lilo
 Elisabeth Goebel as Fräulein Kiekebusch
 Peter Hansmann as Peter
 Hans Reiser as Erich

References

Bibliography 
 Hans-Michael Bock and Tim Bergfelder. The Concise Cinegraph: An Encyclopedia of German Cinema. Berghahn Books, 2009.

External links 
 

1950 films
1950 romantic comedy films
German romantic comedy films
West German films
1950s German-language films
Films directed by Hans Schweikart
Bavaria Film films
German black-and-white films
1950s German films